Mauro Alejandro Barraza (born 15 May 1996) is an Argentine professional footballer who plays as a midfielder for Central Córdoba.

Career
Barraza's career began with Central Córdoba. Victor Riggio selected the midfielder for his senior debut on 19 October 2014, substituting him on after seventy-seven minutes as the club drew 4–4 with San Jorge. Central Córdoba ended the 2014 Torneo Federal A campaign with promotion to Primera B Nacional, which allowed Barraza to make his professional bow in February 2015 against Villa Dálmine. He made twenty-two appearances over the next five years as they went back to Torneo Federal A before eventually reaching the Primera División; his top-flight bow came away to Newell's Old Boys on 28 July 2019.

January 2020 saw Barraza join third tier team Central Norte on loan. He was selected in six matches, before the campaign was ended due to the COVID-19 pandemic.

Career statistics
.

Honours
Central Córdoba
Torneo Federal A: 2017–18

References

External links

1996 births
Living people
People from Santiago del Estero
Argentine footballers
Association football midfielders
Torneo Federal A players
Primera Nacional players
Argentine Primera División players
Central Córdoba de Santiago del Estero footballers
Central Norte players
Sportspeople from Santiago del Estero Province